Aracitaba is a Brazilian municipality located in the state of Minas Gerais. Its population  is estimated to be 2,059 people living in a total area of 105,885 km². The city belongs to the mesoregion of Zona da Mata and to the microregion of Juiz de Fora.

See also
 List of municipalities in Minas Gerais

References

Municipalities in Minas Gerais